The TIFR Centre for Applicable Mathematics is part of the School of Mathematics of the Tata Institute of Fundamental Research.

The centre originated from the school's efforts since the mid-1970s to develop areas in applicable mathematics. In fact, B. V. Sreekantan had proposed setting up this centre during the "Fifth Plan period". Along with the National Centre for Radio Astrophysics and the National Centre for Biological Sciences, the centre was established in the two decades following the 1970s. Many renowned mathematicians from India and overseas have contributed to the centre's development.

Research and consulting 
At the centre, research at advanced level is currently pursued in both theoretical and numerical aspects of differential equations, especially the following subtopics:

 Applications of Nonlinear Functional Analysis in the Study of Differential Equations
 Control Aspects of Partial Differential Equations
 Hyperbolic Equations and Conservation Laws
 Homogenization and Solid Fluid Interactions
 Numerical Analysis of PDE (Special Reference to Atmospheric Dynamics)
Microlocal Analysis
The centre offers consulting at the individual and institutional levels in applying theory to engineering-related problems and in exposition of underlying mathematics.

Education and programs 
The centre has had an active role in training students in areas of applicable mathematics through the IISc-TIFR Joint Programme. Following the deemed university status of TIFR, the TIFR Centre has offered its own programs since 2004, which are:

 Ph.D.
 Integrated Ph.D. (M.Sc. and Ph.D.)
Among its other doctoral programs, the center has an integrated PhD program in mathematics. Eligible students for this program receive a monthly fellowship of Rs 21000. Admissions for this integrated program usually begins each year in August.

The centre has a program to invite visiting professors, both for disseminating new topics through lecture courses and for research collaboration.

The centre also offers post-doctoral fellowships and possibilities of short-term visits.

Notable people 
In September 2015, together with Ritabrata Munshi (from the Tata Institute of Fundamental Research), K. Sandeep (from the TIFR Centre for Applied Mathematics) obtained the Shanti Swarup Bhatnagar Prize for Science and Technology in the field of mathematical sciences.

In January 2019, the Indian Academy of Sciences announced that 23 scientists were elected as fellows of the academy, including Sandeep Kunnath (who studies partial differential equation, variational methods, and nonlinear functional analysis) and G D Veerappa Gowda, both from the TIFR Centre for Applicable Mathematics.

References

External links
  TIFR Centre for applicable mathematics
  TIFR-CAM vision

Research institutes in Bangalore
Tata Institute of Fundamental Research
Educational institutions in India with year of establishment missing
Mathematical institutes